Methylobacterium longum  is a facultative methylotrophy bacteria from the genus of Methylobacterium which has been isolated from the phyllosphere from the plant Arabidopsis thaliana in Spain.

References

Further reading

External links
Type strain of Methylobacterium longum at BacDive -  the Bacterial Diversity Metadatabase

Hyphomicrobiales
Bacteria described in 2012